Northenden is a suburb of Manchester, Greater Manchester, England, with a population of 14,771 at the 2011 census.

Historically a rural township and parish within the hundred of Bucklow in Cheshire, despite unplanned urbanisation and population growth in its neighbours in the 19th century, Northenden remained a comparatively rural and unpopulated area which spanned the hamlets of Lawton Moor, Northern Moor, Rose Hill and a part of what is now Wythenshawe. By 1866 Northenden had coalesced and became a civil parish. The industrialisation of neighbouring Manchester resulted in overpopulation in the early 20th century.

Manchester City Council used the Local Government Act 1929 to extend its boundaries to encompass Northenden in 1931 and throughout the mid-20th century it was redeveloped as an overspill estate.

History

Northenden was mentioned as Norwordine in the Domesday Book of 1086; its name came from Anglo-Saxon Norþ-worþign = "north enclosure". It was then a small farming community with a manor house and woodland. In later times Northenden was sometimes called Northen.

There was a weir on the Mersey in the 14th century (where Mill Lane is now), and a mill was set up there to grind corn. It is recorded in the 16th century as belonging to the Tatton family of Wythenshawe Hall, who had the right to make all their tenants use the mill on payment of a fee. The weir and mill were demolished in the early 1960s.

As Northenden is on a major (and very old) crossing place of the Mersey on the salt road from Cheshire to Manchester, it prospered in medieval times. The ford was an important way into and out of and into Manchester (now Ford Lane), as there was no bridge over the Mersey between Sale and Stockport, until in 1745 Bonnie Prince Charlie's army built a troop-bridge out of big poplar tree trunks where the B5095 (Manchester Road, Didsbury) now crosses the Mersey, south of Didsbury, in his abortive attempt to seize the crown of England. The Northenden ford was unusual because its northern and southern ends were not opposite each other, but people using the ford had to wade about 500 feet along the riverbed. The Simon's Bridge was built at the ford in 1901 to help access to Poor's Field, and the rent from this field was used by the church to buy blankets and clothes for the needy.

Distance from Manchester enabled Northenden to avoid the Industrial Revolution in the 19th century. The nearest it came to industrialisation was a cottage industry in flax spinning. In the 1980s the area became part of the Mersey Valley Park, and the banks of the river form part of the Mersey Valley Trail.

Northenden began to develop as an attractive riverside township for Manchester's more affluent managers, clerks and tradesmen, and the Victorian and Edwardian development gives the village much of its present character. In the wake of Manchester's acquisition of Wythenshawe for a new garden city, Northenden became a district of Manchester in 1931.

Northenden is often referred to as a village by local residents, but during the first half of the 20th century, it expanded with suburban housing at the same time as the Wythenshawe housing estate was built. Northenden, whose centre was formerly Church Road, rapidly developed a new shopping centre along Palatine Road (a new road built to connect with Manchester) to service the new neighbourhood with shops, schools, a cinema (closed 1974), hotels, churches, small businesses and service industries.

Northenden railway station, between Sharston Road and Longley Lane in Sharston, served the area between 1866 and 1964. Passenger trains from Stockport Tiviot Dale to Warrington and Liverpool stopped here.

Governance

Northenden was one of the eight ancient parishes of the Macclesfield Hundred of Cheshire and included the township of Northen Etchells. Under the Poor Law Amendment Act 1886 the parish was split in two as Northen Etchells became a civil parish in its own right. In 1931, both parishes were incorporated into the civil parish and city of Manchester, along with the civil parish of Baguley, which was part of the Bucklow Hundred of Cheshire.

Northenden is part of the Wythenshawe and Sale East constituency, represented by the Labour Party MP Mike Kane.

Councillors 
Northenden is a ward within the local authority of Manchester City Council. The ward is represented by three Labour Councillors: Sarah Russell (Lab), Sam Lynch (Lab), and Mary Monaghan (Lab).

 indicates seat up for re-election.

Geography
Northenden is located in the southern end of the city of Manchester,  from the city centre, and begins on the south bank of the River Mersey.

Present-day Northenden sits in a triangle formed by two motorways (the M56 and M60) and a main dual carriageway (Princess Parkway).

Northenden is one of the many areas within Wythenshawe. It has the same postal code, is part of the Parliamentary constituency (Wythenshawe and Sale East), and is one of the five electoral wards of the Wythenshawe area. In 2003, following a review by the Boundary Committee for England, the Wythenshawe ward of Benchill was disestablished after it was named the most deprived ward in England in the Index of Multiple Deprivation (the Index is a governmental measure of local employment, income, health, education, housing, child poverty, and availability of local services). The area was then divided between the neighbouring wards of Sharston, Woodhouse Park, and Northenden. However, in 2006, after Manchester City Council erected a road sign that said "Welcome to Northenden, Wythenshawe", many Northenden residents objected to the inclusion of the word "Wythenshawe". The residents were accused by one local councillor of snobbish behaviour and attempting to distance themselves from the Wythenshawe area (which is primarily social housing) for the sake of house prices as well as wanting to be seen more as an extension of the affluent neighbouring Didsbury area. The city council agreed to remove the word "Wythenshawe" from the sign, though Northenden is still officially part of the Wythenshawe area.

Places of interest

The Church of St Wilfrid, Northenden is a Grade II* listed building. Most of the church's structure dates from the 19th century, apart from the tower which was built in the 15th century. The 19th-century remodelling was done in red sandstone and is an example of Perpendicular Gothic architecture. St Wilfrid's contains a memorial to 19th-century railway chairman Sir Edward Watkin, founder of the Channel Tunnel Company, who is buried in the church grounds.

The church of St Michael and All Angels, Northenden, designed by N. F. Cachemaille-Day (1935-7) is a Grade II* listed building.

Northenden has the largest Jehovah's Witness Kingdom Hall in the area. The hall is housed in the former Forum Cinema on Palatine Road which was originally built in 1934 to designs by Charles Hartley. The Grade II listed building is a noted example of Art Deco Moderne architecture, with an elaborately decorated foyer and auditorium, and its white faience facade is a striking local landmark.

The area also has places of worship for Methodists, Anglicans, Roman Catholics, Mormons and Quakers.

Northenden Social Club's first premises was a converted First World War army hut, originally used by the medical officer at Heaton Park. Buying it cost £114 and the club had to raise another £412 for it to be transported to their site and established as a social club. In front of the club is the Northenden War Memorial next to Palatine Road. It was a favourite Friday night haunt for Polish paratroopers and other allied soldiers they largely trained during the Second World War at what was Ringway Airport later to become Manchester Airport. It has fairly extensive grounds for parking, bowls and tennis.

The River Mersey passes through Northenden and one of its more popular parts is the weir, which now has a fish ladder enabling migrating salmon and sea trout to get upstream. The weir is flat with tiles and has only a thin sheet of water running down the weir as it is fairly wide. Fishing can be very good here as this stretch contains trout, roach, dace, eels, pike, salmon (mid autumn-mid-spring and this goes for sea trout), chub, barbel, and some grayling have been caught.

A footbridge crosses the Mersey above the weir, and it forms part of the Trans Pennine Trail walking and cycling route across England.

On the west bank of the Mersey stands the derelict Tatton Arms public house. Originally named the Boat House Inn, it was designed in 1874 by the architect James Redford and is a noted example of Tudor Revival architecture. The pub closed in 2007 and lies derelict, and it is scheduled for redevelopment as housing.

Law enforcement
Northenden is covered by the South Manchester Division of Greater Manchester Police.

Notable people

London-born businessman Absalom Watkin (1787–1861) purchased Rose Hill, a large villa off Longley Lane (now on Bronington Close), in 1832 as his family home. Watkin was a Liberal reformer and became a significant figure in Manchester politics, campaigning for an enquiry into the 1819 Peterloo Massacre. His son, Sir Edward Watkin (1819–1901), who became Lord Watkin of Rose Hill, was a Victorian railway magnate. He is especially remembered for his ambitious expansion of London's Metropolitan Railway and his visionary schemes for a Channel Tunnel and a a London rival to the Eiffel Tower. Today, Rose Hill is  a Grade II* listed building.

Popular culture

The Doves wrote a song called Northenden. The lyrics include:

See also

Listed buildings in Manchester-M22
Listed buildings in Manchester-M23

References

Bibliography

External links

Northenden Civic Society
St Wilfrid's, Northenden (the locality: where it is, its history) 
Northenden Conservation Area
Northenden Past 
Northenden Railway Station
Northenden Riverside Park
Northenden Mill
Northenden Social Club history

Areas of Manchester
Manchester City Council Wards
Wythenshawe